The 1899–1900 season is the 26th season of competitive football by Rangers.

Overview
Rangers played a total of 23 competitive matches during the 1899–1900 season. They finished top of the Scottish Division One with 15 wins from 18 matches, losing only once to Old Firm rivals Celtic.

The club again ended the season without the Scottish Cup after losing a semi-final replay to Celtic by 4–0, the original match was drawn 2–2.

Results
All results are written with Rangers' score first.

Scottish League Division One

Scottish Cup

Appearances

See also
 1899–1900 in Scottish football
 1899–1900 Scottish Cup

References

Rangers F.C. seasons
Ran
Scottish football championship-winning seasons